Hardware: Online Arena was an online multiplayer game that focused on vehicular destruction using varying means such as missiles, lasers and machine guns. The game was released for PlayStation 2 with the launch of online play for the console and was thus arguably the first online game for PlayStation 2. The game was not a huge commercial success, selling very little. To boost sales, the game was added onto the network access disk that came with the purchase of the network adaptor and, as a result, the game had become one of the three most popular games played online in 2003, having over 200 users on at any time. GamesMaster said the game was, "A great indicator of the shape of things to come for PS2 online."

A spin-off game on the PlayStation Portable was released in 2005 under the name Fired Up. A PlayStation 4 game based on the original called Hardware: Rivals was released as a PlayStation Plus exclusive beta on the PlayStation Network on 29 September 2015.

External links
 

2003 video games
Europe-exclusive video games
Multiplayer and single-player video games
Multiplayer online games
PlayStation 2 games
PlayStation 2-only games
Sony Interactive Entertainment games
Tank simulation video games
Vehicular combat games
Video games developed in the United Kingdom
Video games scored by Alastair Lindsay
London Studio games